Salair National Park is located on the west slope of the Salair Ridge, which separates Altai Krai (west side) from Kemerovo Oblast (east side).  The low mountains are covered with coniferous forest, while the non-park surroundings to the west are steppe and forest steppe that has mostly been converted to agriculture.  Because of its warm, humid summers, scientists have referred to Salair as the "rainforest of Siberia", with resulting high biodiversity and relict plants preserved from the pre-glacial period. The park was officially created in 2020; it is located in the districts of Zarinsk, Togulsky, Yeltsovsky and Soltonsky of Altai Krai.

Topography
In aspect, the Salair resemble gentle hills: the highest point in the park is Mount Kivda (().  The terrain is marked by a highly networked system of ravines and valleys.  The Salair Ridge is a low northern extension of the Altai Mountains.

Ecoregion and climate
The Salair ridge forms a northwestern extension of the Sayan montane conifer forests ecoregion.  It is closely surrounded at lower altitudes on the east and west by the Western Siberian hemiboreal forests ecoregion. 

The climate of the park is Humid continental climate, warm summer (Köppen climate classification (Dfb)).

Plants and animals
The park is covered with "dark taiga" coniferous forest: stands of Pinus sibirica (Siberian pine), Picea obovata (Siberian spruce), Abies sibirica (Siberian fir), and stands of Tilia sibirica L. (Siberian linden), with vertically developed shrub and grass layers.  There are occasional stands of old-growth cedar and the only stand of indigenous Populus tremula (Quaking aspen) in Siberia.  Individual Siberian pines reach 800 years old.  Present on the forest floor are Asperula odorata, Asarum europaeum, Sanicula europaea, and Brachypodium sylvaticum  There are tall grasses and meadow steppe terrain at lower altitude and in clearings.

Mammals in the park include elk, red deer, roe deer, marmot, American mink, and beaver.

See also
 Protected areas of Russia

References

External links
 Map of Salair National Park, ProtectedPlanet.net
 Map of Salair National Park, OpenStreetMap.org

National parks of Russia